Mor or Mór is a surname which may refer to:

 Alexandra Mor, American jewellery designer 
 Antonis Mor (c. 1517–1577), Netherlandish portrait painter
 Benjamin Mor, half of the rapper duo Blood of Abraham and producer
 Caiseal Mór, Australian fantasy novelist
 Eduard Mor (born 1977), Russian footballer
 Emre Mor (born 1997), Turkish footballer
 Iris Mor (1952–2017), Israeli newspaper editor, literary editor and writer
 Keren Mor (born 1964), Israeli actress and comedian
 Lior Mor (born 1976), Israeli tennis player
 Rina Mor (born 1956), Israeli model and Miss Universe